Kamień is a village in Rzeszów County, Subcarpathian Voivodeship, in south-eastern Poland. It is the seat of the gmina (administrative district) called Gmina Kamień.

The village has a population of 2,700.

References

Villages in Rzeszów County
Kingdom of Galicia and Lodomeria
Lwów Voivodeship